Pine Creek may refer to:

Australia
 Pine Creek, Northern Territory (disambiguation), articles associated with the town and locality
 Pine Creek, Queensland, a locality in the Bundaberg Region, Queensland
 Pine Creek, South Australia, a locality

Canada
 Pine Creek (British Columbia), in the Atlin Country region
 Pine Creek, Manitoba, Canada
 Pine Creek (Ontario), see list of rivers of Ontario

United States

California
 Big Pine Creek (California), a tributary of the Owens River
 Pine Creek, former name of New Pine Creek, California
 Pine Creek (Lassen County), a tributary of Eagle Lake

Idaho

Illinois
 Pine Creek (Rock River tributary)

Iowa
 Pine Creek (Upper Iowa River tributary), a tributary of the Upper Iowa River
 Pine Creek (Canoe Creek tributary), a tributary of Canoe Creek, also in the Upper Iowa River watershed
 Pine Creek Gristmill, listed on the National Register of Historic Places in Muscatine County

Minnesota
 Pinecreek, Minnesota, an unincorporated community in northwest Minnesota
 Pine Creek, Minnesota, an unincorporated community in southeast Minnesota
 Pine Creek (Mississippi River tributary)
 Pine Creek (Roseau River tributary), a stream

Missouri
 Pine Creek (Big Sugar Creek tributary) in McDonald County
 Pine Creek (Bryant Creek tributary) in Ozark County
 Pine Creek (Gasconade River tributary) in Laclede County
 Pine Creek (Jacks Fork tributary) in Howell and Texas counties

Montana
 Pine Creek, Montana

Nevada
 Pine Creek (Humboldt River tributary)

Pennsylvania
 Pine Creek (Pennsylvania), West Branch Susquehanna River tributary
 Pine Creek (Allegheny River tributary)
 Pine Creek (Huntington Creek tributary)
 Pine Creek (Mahantango Creek tributary)
 Pine Creek (Oil Creek tributary)
 Pine Creek (Penns Creek tributary)
 Pine Creek (Solomon Creek tributary), in Luzerne County, Pennsylvania

South Dakota
 Pine Creek (Little White River tributary)

Utah
 Pine Creek (Zion National Park), see Zion – Mount Carmel Highway

Virginia
 Pine Creek (Sandy Creek tributary), a stream in Pittsylvania County, Virginia

West Virginia
 Pine Creek, West Virginia

Wisconsin
 Pine Creek, Wisconsin, an unincorporated community
 Pine Creek (Sauk County, Wisconsin), a stream in Sauk County

See also
 Pine Creek Township (disambiguation)
 Pine Creek Township, Pennsylvania (disambiguation)
 Pine Creek Rail Trail